John W. Moher (7 February 1909 – 10 November 1985) was an Irish Fianna Fáil politician, auctioneer and farmer who was a member of Dáil Éireann representing the Cork East constituency. He was the son of William Moher and Ellen Lyons of Curraghmore, County Cork. He married Sheila O'Neil.

He was a member of the Cork County Council from 1950. Having unsuccessfully contested the 1951 general election and a 1953 by-election, Moher was elected as a Teachta Dála (TD) for the Cork East constituency at the 1954 general election and held his seat – representing the Cork North-East from 1961 – until losing it at the 1965 general election.

He was instrumental in the creation of the National Dairy Research Centre at Moorepark south of Kilworth, County Cork, and was part of the welcoming committee for the 1963 visit of U.S. President John F. Kennedy to Ireland. He opposed the destruction of Grace Castle outside of Clogheen, County Tipperary in 1960.

After his 1965 defeat, he continued to serve on the Cork County Council until 1974. He was also chairman of the Cork Hospital Board and promoted the building of the Cork Regional Hospital (now Cork University Hospital).

References

1909 births
1985 deaths
Fianna Fáil TDs
Members of the 15th Dáil
Members of the 16th Dáil
Members of the 17th Dáil
Irish farmers
Politicians from County Cork